The 1951 Cupa României Final was the 14th final of Romania's most prestigious football cup competition. It was disputed between CCA București and Flacăra Mediaş, and was won by CCA București after a game with 4 goals. It was the third cup title in the history of CCA București.

Flacăra Mediaş was the second club representing Divizia B which reached the Romanian Cup final, after CAM Timișoara which accomplished this in 1938.

Match details

See also 
List of Cupa României finals

References

External links
Romaniansoccer.ro

1951
Cupa
Romania